Dobermann is a German surname. Notable people with the surname include:

Karl Friedrich Louis Dobermann (1834–1894), German dog breeder 
Rudi Dobermann (1902–1979), German athlete

German-language surnames